Fawkner's Hotel was the first hotel in Melbourne, Australia. It was built and run by John Pascoe Fawkner, one of the founders of Melbourne. The business operated, from two successive locations, between 1835 and 1839.

First building

The hotel opened for business on 6 or 7 November 1835. It was located on what is now the corner of William Street and Flinders Lane. It was a simple structure made from sods of turf, plus milled timber brought over from Launceston, Tasmania.

It was initially called the Royal Hotel, then the Port Phillip Hotel, and had become Fawkner's Hotel by the time the first publicans license was issued in 1837. At first it functioned more as a pub than a hotel. A new arrival to the settlement described the premises in December 1835, a month after it opened for business.
 Edmund Finn gives a more detailed description of the establishment on the banks of the Yarra River after it had been in operation for a year or two.

Fawkner had brought his personal book collection from Launceston and guests in the hotel were free to use it in the reading room, while others had to pay a subscription. It was the first public library in Melbourne and Fawkner mentioned it in an advertisement in the first newspaper, which he also started.

The hotel had nine rooms by April 1838. There were three rooms and two lofts in the upper floor,  and a basement under the ground floor. The business had operated for only a few years when, in 1838, the government announced it wanted the land on which it stood as the site for a Customs House. Fawkner was paid £100 in compensation. He had the structure demolished and the building materials were sold to a gunsmith who used them to build a new structure in Market Street. The gunsmith, John Blanche, named his store the "Sporting Emporium." It was destroyed in an explosion on 24 December 1839 when some gunpowder accidentally ignited, causing the death of the gunsmith, his wife and one customer.

Second building

Fawkner purchased an allotment in November 1837 in a sale of Crown Land and this became the site for his second hotel. It too was called Fawkner’s Hotel and was a two-story building, made of brick. Fawkner moved into his new hotel, on the east side of Market Street, near the corner of Collins Street, in the second half of 1838. The official opening was on 2 July 1838 and on that evening, to mark the occasion, the building was illuminated and there were fireworks and gun-fire. The building featured "spacious parlours of great height," 20 beds and, being located higher up the hill from his old hotel, the upper rooms and balcony commanded views of the river, the shipping in Port Phillip Bay and of Williamstown. The kitchen was a separate building in the back yard. Accommodation cost two guineas per week Its greater prominence higher up the hillside meant it often appears in contemporary images of early Melbourne.

Among the visitors who stayed at the hotel was Lady Jane Franklin, the wife of the former Governor of Tasmania, and her entourage, who arrived in April 1839. A deputation of more than sixty prominent settlers met in the largest room of the hotel to welcome her to Melbourne. She admired Fawkner’s bookroom and library, as did another visitor to the hotel, explorer Edward John Eyre. The largest room in the hotel served as a chapel for religious services and as a meeting room for the formation of early commercial and community organisations.

Fawkner's second hotel was only operated by him as such for eighteen months. But the building itself lasted for another century. It became the headquarters for The Melbourne Club in June 1846. It was later the Old Club House Hotel and, later still, the Shakespeare Hotel. It was known as the Union Club Hotel when it finally closed for demolition in 1936.

Significance
Fawkner's pub/hotel was the first public building in Melbourne It was the social centre of the fledgling community in its first few tentative years of existence. Primitive even by the standard of the time, Fawkner had little incentive to build anything better. He knew a civil administrator would soon arrive and one of his first duties would be to order an official survey of the Crown Land on which the settlement stood. Fawkner the other first settlers would then have to demolish any structures they owned and then build new permanent houses and businesses on allotments determined by the official survey.

His second hotel building was a conventional two-story brick building, with an attic, that lasted, in various guises, for another century.

References

Hotels in Melbourne
Colony of Victoria
1835 establishments in Australia
Entertainment venues in Victoria (Australia)